Khaya Majola (born 13 March 1992 in Kokstad, South Africa) is a South African rugby union player who most recently played for the  in the Pro14. His regular position is flanker.

Career

Youth

He represented KwaZulu-Natal since 2008, when he played for them at the Under-16 Grant Khomo Week competition. After playing for a South African Academy side at the Under-18 Craven Week tournament in 2009, he returned to play in the competition for a second time in 2010, this time representing KwaZulu-Natal. At the conclusion of this tournament, he was included in an Under-18 High Performance squad that played in international friendlies against youth sides from France, Namibia and England.

He played for the  side during the 2011 Under-19 Provincial Championship, starting all twelve of their matches and scoring two tries. After a single appearance in the 2012 Vodacom Cup, Majola was included in the South Africa Under-20 squad for the 2012 IRB Junior World Championship held in South Africa. He featured in just one match in the competition, starting their second pool stage match against Italy and helping them to a 52–3 victory. He was named on the bench for their next match against England, but wasn't used during the match or the remainder of the tournament as South Africa eventually won the competition for the first time.

At the conclusion of the Junior World Championship, he made played for the  side in the 2012 Under-21 Provincial Championship, mainly being used as a substitute, but was a regular starter for the side the following season, making eleven starts.

Sharks

He started all eight matches of the 's 2014 Vodacom Cup campaign as they reached the Quarter Finals of the competition as was later named in the ' Currie Cup squad for the first time.

Personal

He is the son of Gerald Majola, a former player and CEO of the governing body of cricket in South Africa, the CSA.

His uncle, also called Khaya Majola, was a cricketer who represented the SAACB (South African African Cricket Board) during the apartheid era and later became a cricket administrator who helped promote cricket in townships.

His grandfather was Eric Majola, who played rugby and cricket for the black national sides in South Africa in the 1950s.

References

1992 births
Living people
People from Kokstad
Xhosa people
South African rugby union players
Rugby union flankers
Sharks (Currie Cup) players
South Africa Under-20 international rugby union players
Southern Kings players
Rugby union players from KwaZulu-Natal